The 2014 Oakland Athletics season  was the 46th for the franchise at O.co Coliseum, as well as the 114th in club history. The Athletics entered the season hoping to win a third consecutive American League West championship; to that end, the team made a number of key signings and trades during the 2013-14 MLB offseason. Notably, Athletics traded outfielder Michael Choice for left fielder Craig Gentry and pitcher Josh Lindblom; they also traded the promising but oft-injured Brett Anderson for reliever Drew Pomeranz. Additional trades brought in relievers Fernando Abad (acquired for John Wooten), Luke Gregerson (acquired for Seth Smith), and Jim Johnson (acquired for Jemile Weeks and David Freitas). In free agency, the Athletics signed former All-Star starting pitcher Scott Kazmir to a two-year deal. These moves, among others, sought to bolster the depth of team's starting pitching and bullpen.

Shortly before the season opener, the Athletics were dealt a huge blow when starting pitchers Jarrod Parker and A. J. Griffin were ruled out for the season. The team responded by promoting reliever Jesse Chavez (and, eventually, Drew Pomeranz) to the starting rotation. Despite this setback, the team raced out to an impressive start; by the All-Star Break, the Athletics had compiled a league-best record of 59-36. Unexpectedly strong performances by starting pitchers Scott Kazmir, Jesse Chavez, and Drew Pomeranz enabled much of this surge; the Athletics' red-hot hitters (particularly sluggers Josh Donaldson, Yoenis Céspedes, and Brandon Moss) also played a major role.

Despite their fantastic first-half performance, the Athletics remained locked in a tight battle for first place in the American League West. The Los Angeles Angels of Anaheim, like the Athletics, had also raced out to an impressive start; at the All-Star Break, the Angels owned the league's second-best record (and, at 57-37, only trailed the Athletics by 1.5 games). In part because of this, the Athletics traded noted prospects Addison Russell and Billy McKinney, along with starting pitcher Dan Straily, to the Chicago Cubs for two starters (ace Jeff Samardzija and veteran Jason Hammel) on July 4th.

The Athletics continued to play well throughout July. Still, they failed to gain significant ground on the Angels. On July 31, with a scant 2.5 game lead over Los Angeles, the Athletics stunned the league by trading Yoenis Céspedes for all-star starter Jon Lester and outfielder Jonny Gomes. In the week immediately following the trade, things went well for the team; by August 9th, they had raised their lead over the Angels to four games. From that point forward, however, the A's were met with disaster. A historic collapse, defined largely by ineffective hitting and a spate of narrow losses, saw Oakland tumble in the American League standings; all told, the team won just 16 of its final 46 games. The Athletics only managed to clinch an AL Wild-Card berth on the final day of the regular season. The team finished some ten games behind the Angels, who clinched the league's best record with an impressive 98-64 finish.

The Athletics met the Kansas City Royals in the 2014 American League Wild Card Game. The Athletics held a 7-3 lead over the Royals through seven innings; a furious Royals rally, however, saw the Royals tie the game by scoring three runs in the eighth inning and one run in the ninth. In the 12th inning, the Athletics' took an 8-7 lead on an Alberto Callaspo line drive; the Royals, however, would again rally for a 9-8 walk-off victory (their first playoff win in 29 years). The Athletics did not reach the postseason again until the 2018 season.

Regular season
Oakland's 2014 season was full of ups and downs. They held the best record in the MLB at (59-36) going into the All-Star break, and were ranked by the Bleacher Report as the number one team in Major League Baseball. By mid-August, however, the Athletics had quickly begun losing ground in the AL race with a record of (11-25) through a 36-game span from August 10, to September 19, and were in the midst of what some called an historic collapse. General manager Billy Beane and his well-known "Moneyball" strategy came under increased scrutiny when Oakland made several personnel transactions, the most significant of which was finalized on July 31, 2014, while they still maintained a 2-game division lead over the Los Angeles Angels of Anaheim. This deal sent All Star left fielder Yoenis Céspedes to the Boston Red Sox in return for starting pitcher Jon Lester and veteran outfielder Jonny Gomes. They would finish the season with a record of (88-74) and finished the second half of the year with a (29-38) record. Ended the season 10 games out of first place behind the Angels, and barely clinched the 2nd Wild Card spot just one game ahead of division rival, Seattle Mariners.

American League West

American League Wild Card

Record against opponents

Schedule and results

Game log

|-  style="text-align:center; background:#fbb;"
| 1 || March 31 || Indians || 0-2 || Cody Allen (1-0) || Jim Johnson (0-1) || John Axford (1) || 36,067 || 0-1
|-

|-  style="text-align:center; background:#bbb;"
| 2 || April 1 || Indians ||colspan=6| PPD, RAIN; rescheduled for April 2
|-  style="text-align:center; background:#bfb;"
| 2 || April 2 || Indians || 6-1 || Scott Kazmir (1-0) || Corey Kluber (0-1) || – || 15,134 || 1-1
|-  style="text-align:center; background:#fbb;"
| 3 || April 2 || Indians || 4-6 || Cody Allen (2-0) || Jim Johnson (0-2) || John Axford (1) || 12,198 || 1-2
|-  style="text-align:center; background:#bfb;"
| 4 || April 3 || Mariners || 3-2 (12) || Drew Pomeranz (1-0) || Héctor Noesí (0-1) || – || 11,236 || 2-2
|-  style="text-align:center; background:#bbb;"
| 5 || April 4 || Mariners ||colspan=6| PPD, FIELD CONDITIONS; rescheduled for May 7
|-  style="text-align:center; background:#fbb;"
| 5 || April 5 || Mariners || 1-3 || Félix Hernández (2-0) || Dan Straily (0-1) || Fernando Rodney (1) || 30,290 || 2-3
|-  style="text-align:center; background:#bfb;"
| 6 || April 6 || Mariners || 6-3 || Sonny Gray (1-0) || Erasmo Ramirez (1-1) || Jim Johnson (1) || 32,852 || 3-3
|-  style="text-align:center; background:#bfb;"
| 7 || April 7 ||@ Twins || 8-3 || Scott Kazmir (2-0) || Kevin Correia (0-1) || – || 35,837 || 4-3
|-  style="text-align:center; background:#bfb;"
| 8 || April 9 || @ Twins || 7-4 (11) || Dan Otero (1-0) || Jared Burton (0-1) || – || 22,973 || 5-3 
|-  style="text-align:center; background:#bfb;"
| 9 || April 10 || @ Twins || 6-1 || Dan Straily (1-1) || Mike Pelfrey (0-2) || – || 20,650 || 6-3 
|-  style="text-align:center; background:#fbb;"
| 10 || April 11 ||@ Mariners || 4-6 || Félix Hernández (3-0) || Tommy Milone (0-1) || Fernando Rodney (3) || 38,968 || 6-4 
|-  style="text-align:center; background:#bfb;"
| 11 || April 12 ||@ Mariners || 3-1 || Sonny Gray (2-0) || Erasmo Ramirez (1-2) || Luke Gregerson (1) || 22,061 || 7-4
|-  style="text-align:center; background:#bfb;"
| 12 || April 13 ||@ Mariners || 3-0 || Dan Otero (2-0) || Charlie Furbush (0-1) || Sean Doolittle (1) || 22,628 || 8-4
|-  style="text-align:center; background:#bfb;"
| 13 || April 14 || @ Angels || 3-2 || Jim Johnson (1-2) || Ernesto Frieri (0-1) || Luke Gregerson (2) || 37,120 || 9-4 
|-  style="text-align:center; background:#bfb;"
| 14 || April 15 || @ Angels || 10-9 (11) || Jim Johnson (2-2) || Yoslan Herrera (0-1) || – || 34,887 || 10-4 
|-  style="text-align:center; background:#fbb;"
| 15 || April 16 || @ Angels || 4-5 (12) || Joe Smith (1-0) || Drew Pomeranz (1-1) || – || 37,324 || 10-5 
|-  style="text-align:center; background:#bfb;"
| 16 || April 18 || Astros || 11-3 || Sonny Gray (3-0) || Jarred Cosart (1-2) || – || 18,234 || 11-5
|-  style="text-align:center; background:#bfb;"
| 17 || April 19 || Astros || 4-3 || Dan Otero (3-0) || Chad Qualls (0-1) || – || 33,166 || 12-5
|-  style="text-align:center; background:#bfb;"
| 18 || April 20 || Astros || 4-1 || Jesse Chavez (1-0) || Brad Peacock (0-2) || Luke Gregerson (3) || 16,382 || 13-5 
|-  style="text-align:center; background:#fbb;"
| 19 || April 21 || Rangers || 3-4 || Neal Cotts (1-1) || Sean Doolittle (0-1) || Joakim Soria (4)|| 13,297 || 13-6 
|-  style="text-align:center; background:#fbb;"
| 20 || April 22 || Rangers || 4-5 || Alexi Ogando (1-1) || Luke Gregerson (0-1) || Joakim Soria (5) || 15,744 || 13-7
|-  style="text-align:center; background:#fbb;"
| 21 || April 23 || Rangers || 0-3 || Martin Perez (4-0) || Sonny Gray (3-1) || – || 18,340 || 13-8
|-  style="text-align:center; background:#bfb;"
| 22 || April 24 || @ Astros|| 10-1 || Scott Kazmir (3-0) || Brett Oberholtzer (0-4) || – || 19,987 || 14-8
|-  style="text-align:center; background:#bfb;"
| 23 || April 25 ||@ Astros || 12-5 || Luke Gregerson (1-1) || Josh Fields (0-2)|| – || 17,708 || 15-8
|-  style="text-align:center; background:#fbb;"
| 24 || April 26 || @Astros || 6-7 || Jerome Williams (1-1) || Sean Doolittle (0-2) || Raúl Valdés (1) || 17,850 || 15-9
|-  style="text-align:center; background:#fbb;"
| 25 || April 27 ||@ Astros || 1-5 || Collin McHugh (2-0) || Tommy Milone (0-2) || – || 18,935 || 15-10
|-  style="text-align:center; background:#bfb;"
| 26 || April 28 || @Rangers || 4-0 || Sonny Gray (4-1) || Yu Darvish (1-1) || – || 28,548 || 16-10
|-  style="text-align:center; background:#bfb;"
| 27 || April 29 || @Rangers || 9-3 || Scott Kazmir (4-0) || Martin Perez (4-1) || – || 30,221 || 17-10
|-  style="text-align:center; background:#bfb;"
| 28 || April 30 ||@ Rangers || 12-1 || Jesse Chavez (2-0) || Robbie Ross (1-2) || – || 32,979 || 18-10
|-

|-  style="text-align:center; background:#fbb;"
| 29 || May 2 ||@ Red Sox || 1-7 || Clay Buchholz (2-2) || Dan Straily (1-2) || – || 34,850 || 18-11
|-  style="text-align:center; background:#fbb;"
| 30 || May 3 ||@ Red Sox || 3-6 || Jon Lester (3-4) || Tommy Milone (0-3) || Koji Uehara (7) || 37,042 || 18-12
|-  style="text-align:center; background:#bfb;"
| 31 || May 4 ||@ Red Sox  || 3-2 (10) || Jim Johnson (3-2) || Chris Capuano (1-1) || – || 35,649 || 19-12
|-  style="text-align:center; background:#fbb;"
| 32 || May 5 || Mariners || 2-4 || Chris Young (2-0) || Scott Kazmir (4-1) || Fernando Rodney (8) || 11,019 || 19-13
|-  style="text-align:center; background:#fbb;"
| 33 || May 6 || Mariners || 3-8 || Roenis Elias (3-2) ||Jesse Chavez (2-1) || – || 12,106 || 19-14
|-  style="text-align:center; background:#fbb;"
| 34 || May 7 || Mariners || 4-6 || Yoervis Medina (2-1) || Ryan Cook (0-1) || Fernando Rodney (9) || 17,337 || 19-15
|-  style="text-align:center; background:#bfb;"
| 35 || May 7 || Mariners || 2-0 || Drew Pomeranz (2-1) || Erasmo Ramirez (1-4)|| Jim Johnson (2) || 17,337 || 20-15
|-  style="text-align:center; background:#bfb;"
| 36 || May 9 || Nationals || 8-0 || Tommy Milone (1-3) || Doug Fister (0-1) || – || 20,159 || 21-15
|-  style="text-align:center; background:#bfb;"
| 37 || May 10 || Nationals || 4-3 (10)|| Sean Doolittle (1-2) || Drew Storen (2-1)|| – || 36,067 || 22-15
|-  style="text-align:center; background:#bfb;"
| 38 || May 11 || Nationals || 9-1 || Scott Kazmir (5-1) || Gio González (3-3) || – || 28,205 || 23-15 
|-  style="text-align:center; background:#bfb;"
| 39 || May 12 || White Sox || 5-4 || Jesse Chavez (3-1) || John Danks (3-3)|| Sean Doolittle (2) || 10,120 || 24-15 
|-  style="text-align:center; background:#bfb;"
| 40 || May 13 || White Sox || 11-0 || Drew Pomeranz (3-1) || Scott Carroll (1-3) || – || 13,826 || 25-15 
|-  style="text-align:center; background:#fbb;"
| 41 || May 14 || White Sox || 2-4 || Ronald Belisario (2-3) || Fernando Abad (0-1) || Matt Lindstrom (6) || 18,035 || 25-16 
|-  style="text-align:center; background:#bfb;"
| 42 || May 16 || @ Indians || 11-1 || Sonny Gray (5-1) || Zach McAllister (3-4) || – || 21,389 || 26-16
|-  style="text-align:center; background:#bfb;"
| 43 || May 17 || @ Indians || 6-2 || Dan Otero (4-0) || Josh Tomlin (2-1) || – || 18,358 || 27-16
|-  style="text-align:center; background:#bfb;"
| 44 || May 18 || @ Indians || 13-3 || Jesse Chavez (4-1) || Justin Masterson (2-3) || – || 14,872 || 28-16
|-  style="text-align:center; background:#bfb;"
| 45 || May 20 || @ Rays || 3-0 || Drew Pomeranz (4-1) || Jake Odorizzi (2-4) || Sean Doolittle (3) || 11,369 || 29-16
|-  style="text-align:center; background:#bfb;"
| 46 || May 21 || @ Rays || 3-2 || Tommy Milone (2-3) || Érik Bédard (2-2) || Sean Doolittle (4) || 10,555 || 30-16
|-  style="text-align:center; background:#fbb;"
| 47 || May 22 || @ Rays || 2-5 (11) || Josh Lueke (1-2) || Dan Otero (4-1) || – || 11,257 || 30-17 
|-  style="text-align:center; background:#fbb;"
| 48 || May 23 || @ Blue Jays || 2-3 || Liam Hendriks (1-0) || Scott Kazmir (5-2) || Casey Janssen (6) || 21,007 || 30-18 
|-  style="text-align:center; background:#fbb;"
| 49 || May 24 || @ Blue Jays || 2-5 || R. A. Dickey (5-4) || Jesse Chavez (4-2) || Brett Cecil (3) || 29,372 || 30-19 
|-  style="text-align:center; background:#fbb;"
| 50 || May 25 || @Blue Jays || 1-3 || J. A. Happ (4-1)|| Drew Pomeranz (4-2) || Casey Janssen (7) || 45,277 || 30-20
|-  style="text-align:center; background:#bfb;"
| 51 || May 26 || Tigers || 10-0 || Tommy Milone (3-3) || Drew Smyly (2-3) || – || 35,067 || 31-20
|-  style="text-align:center; background:#fbb;"
| 52 || May 27 || Tigers || 5-6 || Al Alburquerque (2-1) || Fernando Abad (0-2) || Joe Nathan (12) || 21,549 || 31-21
|-  style="text-align:center; background:#bfb;"
| 53 || May 28 || Tigers || 3-1 || Scott Kazmir (6-2) || Joe Nathan (2-1) || — || 15,590 || 32-21
|-  style="text-align:center; background:#fbb;"
| 54 || May 29 || Tigers || 4-5 || Rick Porcello (8-2) || Jesse Chavez (4-3) || Joe Nathan (13) || 21,860 || 32-22
|-  style="text-align:center; background:#bfb;"
| 55 || May 30 || Angels || 9-5 || Drew Pomeranz (5-2) || Garrett Richards (4-2) || — || 23,384 || 33-22
|-  style="text-align:center; background:#bfb;"
| 56 || May 31 || Angels || 11-3 || Fernando Rodriguez (1-0) || Tyler Skaggs (4-3) || — || 35,067 || 34-22
|-

|-  style="text-align:center; background:#bfb;"
| 57 || June 1 || Angels || 6-3 || Sonny Gray (6-1) || Jered Weaver (6-4) || Sean Doolittle (5) || 32,231 || 35-22
|-  style="text-align:center; background:#bfb;"
| 58 || June 3 ||@ Yankees || 5-2 (10) || Dan Otero (5-1) || Adam Warren (1-3) || Sean Doolittle (6) || 41,677 || 36-22
|-  style="text-align:center; background:#bfb;"
| 59 || June 4 ||@ Yankees || 7-4  || Jesse Chavez (5-3) || José Ramírez (0-1) || Sean Doolittle (7) || 37,734 || 37-22
|-  style="text-align:center; background:#fbb;"
| 60 || June 5 ||@ Yankees || 1-2 || Masahiro Tanaka (9-1) || Drew Pomeranz (5-3) || David Robertson (13) || 44,346 || 37-23 
|-  style="text-align:center; background:#bfb;"
| 61 || June 6 ||@ Orioles || 4-3 (11) ||Fernando Abad (1-2) ||Evan Meek (0-2) || Sean Doolittle (8) || 28,076 || 38-23
|-  style="text-align:center; background:#fbb;"
| 62 || June 7 ||@ Orioles || 3-6 || Kevin Gausman (1-1) || Sonny Gray (6-2) || – || 44,202 || 38-24
|-  style="text-align:center; background:#bfb;"
| 63 || June 8 ||@ Orioles || 11-1 || Scott Kazmir (7-2) || Ubaldo Jiménez (2-7) || – || 38,244 || 39-24
|-  style="text-align:center; background:#fbb;"
| 64 || June 9 ||@ Angels || 1-4 || Garrett Richards (6-2) || Jesse Chavez (5-4) || Ernesto Frieri (11) || 36,838 || 39-25 
|-  style="text-align:center; background:#fbb;"
| 65 || June 10 ||@ Angels || 1-2 (15) || Cory Rasmus (2-0) || Jeff Francis (0-2) || – || 31,942 || 39-26 
|-  style="text-align:center; background:#bfb;"
| 66 || June 11 ||@ Angels || 7-1 || Tommy Milone (4-3) || Jered Weaver (7-5) || – || 36,793 || 40-26 
|-  style="text-align:center; background:#fbb;"
| 67 || June 13 || Yankees || 0-7 || David Phelps (2-4) || Sonny Gray (6-3) || – || 36,067 || 40-27 
|-  style="text-align:center; background:#bfb;"
| 68 || June 14 || Yankees || 5-1 || Scott Kazmir (8-2) || Hiroki Kuroda (4-5) || – || 36,067 || 41-27 
|-  style="text-align:center; background:#bfb;"
| 69 || June 15 || Yankees || 10-5 || Jesse Chavez (6-4) || Vidal Nuño (1-3) || – || 36,067 || 42-27
|-  style="text-align:center; background:#fbb;"
| 70 || June 16 || Rangers || 8-14 || Colby Lewis (5-4) || Drew Pomeranz (5-4) || – || 12,412 || 42-28 
|-  style="text-align:center; background:#bfb;"
| 71 || June 17 || Rangers || 10-6 || Tommy Milone (5-3) || Yu Darvish (7-3) || – || 21,288 || 43-28 
|-  style="text-align:center; background:#bfb;"
| 72 || June 18 || Rangers || 4-2 || Sonny Gray (7-3) || Nick Tepesch (2-3) || Sean Doolittle (9) || 23,175 || 44-28
|-  style="text-align:center; background:#bfb;"
| 73 || June 19 ||Red Sox || 4-2 || Scott Kazmir (9-2) || Jake Peavy (1-5) || Dan Otero (1) || 24,371 || 45-28
|-  style="text-align:center; background:#bfb;"
| 74 || June 20 ||Red Sox || 4-3 || Fernando Abad (2-2) || Andrew Miller (2-5) || Sean Doolittle (10) || 28,602 || 46-28
|-  style="text-align:center; background:#bfb;"
| 75 || June 21 ||Red Sox || 2-1 (10) || Dan Otero (6-1) || Edward Mujica (2-3) || – || 32,873|| 47-28 
|-  style="text-align:center; background:#fbb;"
| 76 || June 22 ||Red Sox || 6-7 (10) || Koji Uehara (3-1) || Fernando Abad (2-3) || – || 36,067 || 47-29
|-  style="text-align:center; background:#fbb;"
| 77 || June 24 || @Mets || 1-10 || Bartolo Colón (8-5) ||Scott Kazmir (9-3) || – || 25,751 || 47-30 
|-  style="text-align:center; background:#bfb;"
| 78 || June 25 || @Mets || 8-5 || Brad Mills (1-0) || Zack Wheeler (3-8) || Sean Doolittle (11) || 23,367 || 48-30
|-  style="text-align:center; background:#bfb;"
| 79 || June 27 ||@ Marlins || 9-5 || Luke Gregerson (2-1) || Steve Cishek (4-3) || – || 18,666 || 49-30
|-  style="text-align:center; background:#bfb;"
| 80 || June 28 ||@ Marlins || 7-6 (14) || Jim Johnson (4-2) || Jacob Turner (2-6) || Jeff Francis (1) || 19,358 || 50-30
|-  style="text-align:center; background:#bfb;"
| 81 || June 29 ||@ Marlins || 4-3 || Tommy Milone (6-3) || Andrew Heaney (0-3) || Ryan Cook (1) || 21,917 || 51-30
|-  style="text-align:center; background:#fbb;"
| 82 || June 30 ||@ Tigers || 4-5 || Blaine Hardy (1-1) || Sean Doolittle (1-3) || – || 42,477 || 51-31
|-

|-  style="text-align:center; background:#fbb;"
| 83 || July 1 ||@ Tigers || 0-3 || Rick Porcello (11-4) || Brad Mills (1-1) || – || 32,455  || 51-32
|-  style="text-align:center; background:#fbb;"
| 84 || July 2 ||@ Tigers || 3-9 || Justin Verlander (7-7) || Jesse Chavez (6-5) || – || 35,445 || 51-33
|-  style="text-align:center; background:#bfb;"
| 85 || July 3 || Blue Jays || 4-1 || Sonny Gray (8-3)  || R. A. Dickey (6-8)  || Sean Doolittle (12) || 32,913 || 52-33
|-  style="text-align:center; background:#bfb;"
| 86 || July 4 || Blue Jays || 1-0 (12) || Dan Otero (7-1) || Chad Jenkins (0-1) || – || 22,322 || 53-33
|-  style="text-align:center; background:#bfb;"
| 87 || July 5 || Blue Jays || 5-1 || Scott Kazmir (10-3)  || Mark Buehrle (10-6) || – || 20,236  || 54-33
|-  style="text-align:center; background:#bfb;"
| 88 || July 6 || Blue Jays || 4-2 || Jeff Samardzija (1-0) || Drew Hutchison (6-7)  || Sean Doolittle (13) || 22,897 || 55-33
|-  style="text-align:center; background:#bfb;"
| 89 || July 7 || Giants || 5-0 || Jesse Chavez (7-5)  || Ryan Vogelsong (5-6) || – || 36,067 || 56-33
|-  style="text-align:center; background:#bfb;"
| 90 || July 8 || Giants || 6-1 || Sonny Gray (9-3) || Madison Bumgarner (9-7)  || – || 36,067 || 57-33
|-  style="text-align:center; background:#fbb;"
| 91 || July 9 ||@ Giants || 2-5 || Matt Cain (2-7) || Jason Hammel (0-1) || – || 41,427 || 57-34
|-  style="text-align:center; background:#bfb;"
| 92 || July 10 ||@ Giants || 6-1 || Scott Kazmir (11-3) || Tim Hudson (7-6)  || – || 41,069 || 58-34
|-  style="text-align:center; background:#fbb;"
| 93 || July 11 ||@ Mariners || 2-3 || Félix Hernández (11-2) || Jeff Samardzija (1-1) || Fernando Rodney (29) || 32,971 || 58-35
|-  style="text-align:center; background:#fbb;"
| 94 || July 12 ||@ Mariners || 2-6 || Hisashi Iwakuma (8-4) || Jesse Chavez (7-6) || – || 39,204 || 58-36
|-  style="text-align:center; background:#bfb;"
| 95 || July 13 ||@ Mariners || 4-1 || Sonny Gray (10-3) || Chris Young (8-6) || Sean Doolittle (14) || 25,944 || 59-36
|-  style="text-align:center; background:#bbb;"
| -- || July 15 || 85th All-Star Game ||colspan=6|National League 3   American League 5   (Minneapolis, Minnesota;  Target Field)
|-  style="text-align:center; background:#bfb;"
| 96 || July 18 || Orioles || 5-4 || Eric O'Flaherty (1-0) || Zach Britton (3-2) || – || 27,232 || 60-36
|-  style="text-align:center; background:#fbb;"
| 97 || July 19 || Orioles || 4-8 || Wei-Yin Chen (10-3) || Jason Hammel (0-2) || Zach Britton (16) || 36,067 || 60-37
|-  style="text-align:center; background:#bfb;"
| 98 || July 20 || Orioles || 10-2 || Sonny Gray (11-3) || Kevin Gausman (4-3) || – || 30,124 || 61-37
|-  style="text-align:center; background:#fbb;"
| 99 || July 22 || Astros || 2-3 (12) || Darin Downs (2-1) || Fernando Abad (2-4) || Chad Qualls (11) || 22,908 || 61-38
|-  style="text-align:center; background:#bfb;"
| 100 || July 23 || Astros || 9-7 || Jesse Chavez (8-6) || Brad Peacock (3-7) || Sean Doolittle (15) || 28,310 || 62-38
|-  style="text-align:center; background:#bfb;"
| 101 || July 24 || Astros || 13-1 || Jeff Samardzija (2-1) || Scott Feldman (4-8) || – || 22,759 || 63-38
|-  style="text-align:center; background:#fbb;"
| 102 || July 25 || @Rangers || 1-4 || Jerome Williams (2-4) || Jason Hammel (0-3) || Neftalí Feliz (1) || 35,582 || 63-39
|-  style="text-align:center; background:#bfb;"
| 103 || July 26 || @Rangers || 5-1 || Sonny Gray (12-3) || Nick Tepesch (3-7) || – || 34,651 || 64-39
|-  style="text-align:center; background:#bfb;"
| 104 || July 27 ||@ Rangers || 9-3 || Scott Kazmir (12-3) || Miles Mikolas (1-3) || – || 38,915 || 65-39
|-  style="text-align:center; background:#fbb;"
| 105 || July 28 ||@ Astros || 3-7 || Brett Oberholtzer (3-7) || Jesse Chavez (8-7) || – || 18,259 || 65-40
|-  style="text-align:center; background:#bfb;"
| 106 || July 29 ||@ Astros || 7-4 || Evan Scribner (1-0) || Chad Qualls (1-2) || Sean Doolittle (16) || 16,940 || 66-40
|-  style="text-align:center; background:#fbb;"
| 107 || July 30 ||@ Astros || 1-8 || Dallas Keuchel (10-7) || Jason Hammel (0-4) || – || 17,637 || 66-41
|-

|-  style="text-align:center; background:#fbb;"
| 108 || August 1 || Royals || 0-1 || Jeremy Guthrie (7-9) || Sonny Gray (12-4)  || Greg Holland (30) || 35,067 || 66-42
|-  style="text-align:center; background:#bfb;"
| 109 || August 2 || Royals || 8-3 || Jon Lester (1-0) || Jason Vargas (8-5) || – || 30,097  || 67-42
|-  style="text-align:center; background:#fbb;"
| 110 || August 3 || Royals || 2-4 || James Shields (10-6) || Scott Kazmir (12-4)  || Greg Holland (31) || 22,612 || 67-43
|-  style="text-align:center; background:#bfb;"
| 111 || August 4 || Rays || 3-2  (10) || Ryan Cook (1-1) || Grant Balfour (1-4) || –  || 18,479 || 68-43
|-  style="text-align:center; background:#bfb;"
| 112 || August 5 || Rays || 3-0 || Jason Hammel (1-4) || Drew Smyly (6-10) || Sean Doolittle (17) || 16,335 || 69-43
|-  style="text-align:center; background:#fbb;"
| 113 || August 6 || Rays || 3-7  || Jeremy Hellickson (1-1) || Sonny Gray (12-5) || – || 21,513 || 69-44
|-  style="text-align:center; background:#bfb;"
| 114 || August 7 || Twins || 3-0 || Jon Lester (2-0) || Yohan Pino (1-4) || – || 22,108 || 70-44
|-  style="text-align:center; background:#bfb;"
| 115 || August 8 || Twins || 6-5 || Scott Kazmir (13-4) || Kyle Gibson (10-9) || Sean Doolittle (18) || 20,196 || 71-44
|-  style="text-align:center; background:#bfb;"
| 116 || August 9 || Twins || 9-4 || Jeff Samardzija (3-1) || Trevor May (0-1)  || – || 32,074 || 72-44
|-  style="text-align:center; background:#fbb;"
| 117 || August 10 || Twins || 1-6 || Phil Hughes (12-8)  || Luke Gregerson (2-2) || – || 25,598 || 72-45
|-  style="text-align:center; background:#fbb;"
| 118 || August 11 ||@ Royals || 2-3 || Kelvin Herrera (3-2) || Sonny Gray (12-6) || Greg Holland (35) || 21,479 || 72-46 
|-  style="text-align:center; background:#bfb;"
| 119 || August 12 ||@ Royals || 11-3 || Jon Lester (3-0) || Jeremy Guthrie (8-10) || – || 27,161 || 73-46
|-  style="text-align:center; background:#fbb;"
| 120 || August 13 ||@ Royals || 0-3 || Jason Vargas (9-5) || Scott Kazmir (13-5) || – || 21,099 || 73-47
|-  style="text-align:center; background:#fbb;"
| 121 || August 14 ||@ Royals || 3-7 || Aaron Crow (6-1) || Jeff Samardzija (3-2) || Greg Holland (36) || 20,569 || 73-48
|-  style="text-align:center; background:#fbb;"
| 122 || August 15 ||@ Braves || 2-7 || Alex Wood (9-9) || Jason Hammel (1-5) || – || 30,606 || 73-49 
|-  style="text-align:center; background:#fbb;"
| 123 || August 16 ||@ Braves || 3-4 || Julio Teherán (11-9) || Sonny Gray (12-7) || Craig Kimbrel (36) || 40,760 || 73-50
|-  style="text-align:center; background:#fbb;"
| 124 || August 17 ||@ Braves || 3-4 || Mike Minor (5-8) || Jon Lester (3-1) || Craig Kimbrel (37) || 25,461 || 73-51
|-  style="text-align:center; background:#bfb;"
| 125 || August 19 || Mets || 6-2 || Scott Kazmir (14-5) || Dillon Gee (4-6) || – || 23,498 || 74-51
|-  style="text-align:center; background:#fbb;"
| 126 || August 20 || Mets || 5-8 || Zack Wheeler (9-8) || Jeff Samardzija (3-3) || Jeurys Familia (4) || 20,312 || 74-52 
|-  style="text-align:center; background:#bfb;"
| 127 || August 22 || Angels || 5-3 || Sonny Gray (13-7) || Jason Grilli (1-4) || Sean Doolittle (19) || 33,810 || 75-52
|-  style="text-align:center; background:#bfb;"
| 128 || August 23 || Angels || 2-1 || Luke Gregerson (3-2) || Joe Smith (5-2) || Sean Doolittle (20) || 36,067 || 76-52
|-  style="text-align:center; background:#fbb;"
| 129 || August 24 || Angels || 4-9 || Jered Weaver (14-7) || Scott Kazmir (14-6) || – || 36,067 || 76-53
|-  style="text-align:center; background:#bfb;"
| 130 || August 25 ||@ Astros || 8-2 || Jeff Samardzija (4-3) || Scott Feldman (7-10) || – || 14,094 || 77-53
|-  style="text-align:center; background:#fbb;"
| 131 || August 26 ||@ Astros || 2-4 || Josh Fields (4-6) || Luke Gregerson (3-3) || Chad Qualls (15) || 17,345 || 77-54
|-  style="text-align:center; background:#bfb;"
| 132 || August 27 ||@ Astros || 5-4 || Dan Otero (8-1) || Chad Qualls (1-4) || Eric O'Flaherty (1) || 14,791 || 78-54
|-  style="text-align:center; background:#fbb;"
| 133 || August 28 ||@ Angels || 3-4 (10) || Fernando Salas (5-0) ||Ryan Cook (1-2)  || – || 41,056 || 78-55
|-  style="text-align:center; background:#fbb;"
| 134 || August 29 ||@ Angels || 0-4 || Jered Weaver (15-7) || Jon Lester (3-2) || – || 41,177 || 78-56
|-  style="text-align:center; background:#fbb;"
| 135 || August 30 ||@ Angels || 0-2 || Yoslan Herrera (1-1) || Jeff Samardzija (4-3) || Huston Street (11) || 44,018 || 78-57
|-  style="text-align:center; background:#fbb;"
| 136 || August 31 ||@ Angels || 1-8 || Matt Shoemaker (14-4) || Scott Kazmir (14-7) || – || 44,205 || 78-58
|-

|-  style="text-align:center; background:#bfb;"
| 137 || September 1 || Mariners || 6-1 || Jason Hammel (2-5) || Chris Young (12-7) || – || 36,067 || 79-58
|-  style="text-align:center; background:#fbb;"
| 138 || September 2 || Mariners || 5-6 || James Paxton (5-1) || Sonny Gray (13-8) || Fernando Rodney (40) || 23,859 || 79-59
|-  style="text-align:center; background:#fbb;"
| 139 || September 3 || Mariners || 1-2 || Félix Hernández (14-5) || Jon Lester (3-3) || Fernando Rodney (41) || 17,073 || 79-60
|-  style="text-align:center; background:#fbb;"
| 140 || September 5 || Astros || 3-4 || Brett Oberholtzer (5-10) || Jeff Samardzija (4-4) || Tony Sipp (3) || 21,130 || 79-61
|-  style="text-align:center; background:#bfb;"
| 141 || September 6 || Astros || 4-3 || Luke Gregerson (4-3) || Chad Qualls (1-5) || – || 28,668 || 80-61 
|-  style="text-align:center; background:#fbb;"
| 142 || September 7 || Astros || 3-4 || José Veras (4-0) || Ryan Cook (1-3) || Josh Fields (3) || 25,533 || 80-62
|-  style="text-align:center; background:#fbb;"
| 143 || September 8 ||@ White Sox || 4-5 (11) || Javy Guerra (2-3) || Jesse Chavez (8-8) || – || 15,517 || 80-63
|-  style="text-align:center; background:#bfb;"
| 144 || September 9 ||@ White Sox || 11-2 || Jon Lester (4-3) || John Danks (9-11) || – || 12,150 || 81-63
|-  style="text-align:center; background:#fbb;"
| 145 || September 10 ||@ White Sox || 1-2 || Zach Putnam (5-3) || Luke Gregerson (4-4) || Jake Petricka (12) || 15,046 || 81-64
|-  style="text-align:center; background:#fbb;"
| 146 || September 11 ||@ White Sox || 0-1 || Chris Sale (12-3) || Scott Kazmir (14-8) || Jake Petricka (13) || 12,314 || 81-65
|-  style="text-align:center; background:#fbb;"
| 147 || September 12 ||@ Mariners || 2-4 || James Paxton (6-2) || Jason Hammel (2-6) || Fernando Rodney (45) || 29,090 || 81-66
|-  style="text-align:center; background:#bfb;"
| 148 || September 13 ||@ Mariners || 3-2 || Luke Gregerson (5-4) || Fernando Rodney (1-6) || Sean Doolittle (21) || 43,913 || 82-66
|-  style="text-align:center; background:#bfb;"
| 149 || September 14 ||@ Mariners || 4-0 || Jon Lester (5-3) || Chris Young (12-8) || – || 28,925 || 83-66
|-  style="text-align:center; background:#fbb;"
| 150 || September 16 || Rangers || 3-6 || Nick Tepesch (5-10) || Scott Kazmir (14-9) || Neftalí Feliz (10) || 19,835 || 83-67
|-  style="text-align:center; background:#fbb;"
| 151 || September 17 || Rangers || 1-6 || Robbie Ross (3-6) || Sean Doolittle (1-4) || – || 17,530 || 83-68
|-  style="text-align:center; background:#fbb;"
| 152 || September 18 || Rangers || 2-7 || Nick Martinez (4-11) || Sonny Gray (13-9) || – || 17,574 || 83-69
|-  style="text-align:center; background:#bfb;"
| 153 || September 19 || Phillies || 3-1 || Jon Lester (16-10) || David Buchanan (6-8) || Sean Doolittle (22) || 35,067 || 84-69
|-  style="text-align:center; background:#fbb;"
| 154 || September 20 || Phillies || 0-3 || Jerome Williams (6-7) || Dan Otero (8-2) || Ken Giles (1) || 31,848 || 84-70
|-  style="text-align:center; background:#bfb;"
| 155 || September 21 || Phillies || 8-6 || Sean Doolittle (2-4) || Miguel Alfredo González (0-1) || – || 25,126 || 85-70
|-  style="text-align:center; background:#bfb;"
| 156 || September 22 || Angels || 8-4 || Jeff Samardzija (5-5) || C. J. Wilson (13-10) || – || 25,455 || 86-70
|-  style="text-align:center; background:#fbb;"
| 157 || September 23 || Angels || 0-2 || Wade LeBlanc (1–1) || Sonny Gray (13–10) || Huston Street (40) || 27,588 || 86-71 
|-  style="text-align:center; background:#fbb;"
| 158 || September 24 || Angels || 4-5 || Hector Santiago (6–9) || Jon Lester (16–11) || Huston Street (41) || 27,989 || 86-72
|-  style="text-align:center; background:#fbb;"
| 159 || September 25 ||@ Rangers || 1-2 || Neftalí Feliz (2–1) || Luke Gregerson (5–5) || || 33,696 || 86-73
|-  style="text-align:center; background:#bfb;"
| 160 || September 26 ||@ Rangers || 6-2 || Scott Kazmir (15–9) || Nick Tepesch (5–11) || || 31,586 || 87-73
|-  style="text-align:center; background:#fbb;"
| 161 || September 27 ||@ Rangers || 4-5 || Spencer Patton (1–0) || Jeff Samardzija (7–13) || Neftalí Feliz || 35,326 || 87-74
|-  style="text-align:center; background:#bfb;"
| 162 || September 28 ||@ Rangers || 4-0 || Sonny Gray (14–10) || Nick Martinez (5–12) || || 36,381 || 88-74
|-

Post-season

Wild Card Game

The 2014 American League Wild Card game took place on September 30, 2014 at Kauffman Stadium in Kansas City, Missouri. The Oakland Athletics took on the Kansas City Royals. Oakland went out to an early lead after a first inning 2-run home run from Brandon Moss, scoring Coco Crisp. Kansas City responded in the bottom half of the inning, and trimmed Oakland's Lead to 1 after a Billy Butler single, scoring Nori Aoki. The Royals later took the lead in the 3rd inning, following two RBI singles from Lorenzo Cain, and Eric Hosmer. In the top of the 6th inning, Brandon Moss hit his second homerun of the game, which scored Sam Fuld and Josh Donaldson. Followed by RBI singles from Derek Norris and Coco Crisp, making the score 7-3 Oakland after 6 innings. The Royals then scored 3 more runs in the bottom of the 8th inning, making the score 7-6. Kansas City would later tie the game in the bottom of the 9th using their well documented "small ball" techniques, and scored from an Aoki sacrifice fly, sending the game to extra innings. Both teams remained scoreless until the top of the 12th, where Alberto Callaspo scored Josh Reddick on a single to left field, which put the Athletics up 8-7. In the bottom of the 12th Kansas city rallied back, and tied the game on an infield single, and later won the game in walk-off fashion on a Salvador Pérez single down the 3rd base line. The 2014 AL Wild Card playoff game became the longest game in the history of the MLB wild card. The Royals would later continue their hot streak, and found themselves in the 2014 World Series, where they later lost to the San Francisco Giants.

Postseason game log

|-  style="text-align:center; background:#fbb;"
| 1 || September 30 || @ Royals || 8–9 (12) || Frasor (1–0) || Otero (0–1) || – || 40,502 || 0–1
|-

Roster

All-stars
The following players represented the Athletics at the 2014 Major League Baseball All-Star Game:
 3B Josh Donaldson
 C Derek Norris	
 1B Brandon Moss
 OF Yoenis Céspedes	 
 LHP Sean Doolittle	
 LHP Scott Kazmir

Farm system

LEAGUE CHAMPIONS: Midland

References

External links

2014 Oakland Athletics season at Baseball Reference
2014 Oakland Athletics season Official Site

Oakland Athletics seasons
Oakland Athletics
2010s in Oakland, California
Oak